Koleybi (also Romanized as Koleybī and Kalibi) is a village in Howmeh Rural District, in the Central District of Minab County, Hormozgan Province, Iran. At the 2006 census, its population was 651, in 131 families.

References 

Populated places in Minab County